The Department of Families (also known as Manitoba Families) is the Manitoba Government agency responsible for family-related programs and services in the province of Manitoba.

The Department was created on 3 May 2016 by the newly-elected government of Brian Pallister, combining the responsibilities of the former Departments of Family Services and of Housing and Community Development into a single unit.

In 2021, Rochelle Squires became the Minister of Families, replacing Minister Heather Stefanson. The department also includes the Minister responsible for the Status of Women.

Department history
The two-year process of preparing a new Child Welfare Act for Manitoba begun in 1922, partly in response to the Manitoba Social Service Council's call to the provincial government:

The Government created the new Department of Public Welfare in 1924 and added it to the existing responsibilities of the Minister of Education. Between 1928 and 1961, it was known as the Department of Health and Public Welfare, followed by the Department of Welfare in 1961. In 1990, it was renamed to the Department of Family Services, and in 1999, the Department of Family Services and Housing. In 2009, the name was changed to Family Services and Consumer Affairs. In 2012, the department became Family Services and Labour. In 2013, the department returned to the name Family Services.

In 2016, the department name was changed to the Department of Families.

Minister of Families 

The Department of Families in Manitoba is overseen by the Minister of Families, which was assigned to Rochelle Squires in 2021, replacing  former Minister Heather Stefanson.

In 1990, the Minister of Family Services is a cabinet position in the Government of Manitoba. In 1999, the responsibilities of this portfolio were assigned to the new Minister of Family Services and Housing.

The position of the Minister of Family Services and Housing was created in 1999, incorporating the responsibilities of the former Minister of Family Services and Minister of Housing. In 2009, the responsibilities of the portfolio were split into Family Services and Consumer Affairs and Housing and Community Development following the announcement of Premier Greg Selinger's new cabinet in 2009.

The Minister of Family Services and Consumer Affairs, which was created in 2009, would have its portfolio's functions redistributed in 2012 between the Minister of Family Services and Labour and the Minister of Healthy Living, Seniors and Consumer Affairs.

In 2013, the Minister of Family Services position was reinstated; however, in 2016, the responsibilities of this portfolio would be assigned to the new Minister of Families.

Related legislation

Family Services

Housing and Community Development

See also
List of Manitoba government departments and agencies

References

External links
Government of Manitoba - Families

Manitoba government departments and agencies
Government agencies established in 1924
1924 establishments in Manitoba